Christopher John Lines (born 30 November 1985) is an English professional footballer who plays as a midfielder for  club Bath City.

Lines turned professional at Bristol Rovers, and made his first team debut in January 2006. He played in the 2007 Football League Trophy final defeat and was an unused substitute in the League Two play-off final victory, before becoming a first team regular from the 2007–08 season. He was sold on to Sheffield Wednesday for £50,000 in August 2011, and was a key first team player as the "Owls" won promotion to the Championship at the end of the 2011–12 campaign. However, he lost his first team place the following season, and was loaned out to Milton Keynes Dons in January 2013.

He signed with Port Vale in July 2013. A key first team player in the 2013–14 season, he lost his first team place and returned to Bristol Rovers on loan in March 2015, helping Rovers to win promotion out of the Conference Premier via the play-offs before rejoining Rovers on a permanent basis in the summer. He helped Rovers to achieve a second successive promotion in the 2015–16 campaign and left the club, in May 2019, for the second time then he joined Northampton Town. He helped Northampton to win promotion out of League Two via the play-offs in 2020 and then moved on to Stevenage for a 18-month stay in January 2021. He dropped into non-League football to play for Bath City in June 2022.

Career

Bristol Rovers
Born in Bristol, Lines spent a year playing for Bitton as a 16-year-old, before graduating through the Bristol Rovers-backed Bristol Academy of Sport at South Gloucestershire and Stroud College. He had previously been released from the Bristol Rovers youth programme, but was re-signed at the age of 16. He made his first-team debut for Rovers on 21 January 2006, playing the last five minutes of a 2–1 win over Chester City at the Memorial Stadium. After two further substitute appearances in League Two, he made his first league start on 6 May, in a 3–2 home defeat to Macclesfield Town.

After three appearances in the 2006–07 campaign, he featured in six matches from March onwards, and was an extra-time substitute for Lewis Haldane in the Football League Trophy final defeat to Doncaster Rovers at the Millennium Stadium. He was an unused substitute in the League Two play-off final, as Rovers won promotion with a 3–1 victory over Shrewsbury Town at Wembley.

He became a first team regular under manager Paul Trollope in the 2007–08 season, playing 27 League One games and featuring in eight of the "Gasheads" nine FA Cup games en route to the quarter-finals. BBC reporter Nathan Mercer credited Lines with an "excellent" performance as Rovers beat Premier League side Fulham on penalties in the Third Round on 22 January, and Lines was fouled by Dejan Stefanović in an incident which saw the Serbian sent off. He scored his first goal in competitive football on 29 December, opening the scoring in a 3–0 home win over Carlisle United with a header. He played 48 games in the 2008–09 season, and missed only one league game due a suspension he picked up whilst celebrating an injury-time equaliser he scored against Swindon Town on 22 November.

Lines was nominated for the League One Player of the Month award in November 2009 after scoring a goal in each of his three league games that month. He signed a new three-and-a-half-year contract with Rovers in January 2010, and was described by director of football Lennie Lawrence as "a fundamental part of our plans to take this club forward." This came shortly after he was reported to be a transfer target for Southampton manager Alan Pardew. The transfer rumours continued despite the new contract. In total he scored ten goals in 46 appearances in the 2009–10 campaign.

He was ruled out for two weeks with a toe injury in February 2011, but thanked manager Dave Penney after he made an immediate return to the first team. Despite this praise he publicly supported the board's decision to sack Penney the following month, and went on to praise the impact of caretaker-manager Stuart Campbell. Following Rovers' relegation to League Two at the end of the 2010–11 season, Lines spent seven days on trial at Championship side Crystal Palace. New Rovers boss Paul Buckle admitted that he was unlikely to keep Lines for the following season. He was still at the club though for the 2011–12 season opening victory over AFC Wimbledon at Kingsmeadow.

Sheffield Wednesday

In August 2011, Lines joined League One club Sheffield Wednesday on a three-year contract for a £50,000 fee. He went on to score four goals in 47 appearances in the 2011–12 campaign as Wednesday secured promotion with a second-place finish, and was twice named on the League One Team of the Week. He made 12 assists in the campaign, just two fewer than divisional assist leader Stephen Quinn.

He picked up a groin injury at the start of the 2012–13 season, and was out of action for three months. Manager Dave Jones played Lines in six Championship games in the buildup to Christmas, though did not play him in the new year. On 22 January 2013, Lines joined League One Milton Keynes Dons on loan for the remainder of the season after manager Karl Robinson admitted that Lines was "a player I have admired for a number of years now". Robinson was in search of midfield options after Luke Chadwick and Stephen Gleeson both picked up injuries. He featured in 18 games for the MK Dons, including the 4–2 victory over Premier League side Queens Park Rangers at Loftus Road in the Fourth Round of the FA Cup. After returning from Stadium mk, Lines had his contract at Hillsborough cancelled by mutual consent in July 2013.

Port Vale
Lines signed a one-year contract with newly promoted League One side Port Vale in July 2013. In the first part of the 2013–14 season he began tracking back to help his defence whilst also being the key playmaker in central midfield, after a discussion with manager Micky Adams. He scored his first goal for the "Valiants" with a "superb free-kick" from 25-yards in a 1–0 win over Tranmere Rovers at Prenton Park on 29 September. He went on to build a partnership in midfield with Anthony Griffith, who provided tough-tackling skills whilst Lines played as a creative playmaker. He signed a new two-year contract in June 2014. He said that the good team spirit at the club was a major factor in him signing the contract.

He remained a key first team player in the first half of the 2014–15 season, being named on the Football League Team of the Week after he "pulled the strings" in a 4–1 win over Yeovil Town at Vale Park. However he was sent off for violent conduct after thrusting his head towards Dele Alli in a 1–0 defeat to Milton Keynes Dons at Stadium mk on 22 November; manager Rob Page stated that he was disappointed in Lines. After returning from suspension he lost his midfield spot to Michael O'Connor and Michael Brown.

Return to Bristol Rovers
On 9 March 2015, he rejoined his first professional club, Bristol Rovers, on loan until the end of the 2014–15 season. They ended the Conference Premier campaign in second place, but Lines scored a goal in a 3–0 aggregate victory over Forest Green Rovers in the play-off semi-finals to help Rovers to reach the play-off final at Wembley Stadium. He played in the 1–1 draw with Grimsby Town in the play-off final and converted the first penalty of the shoot-out, which Rovers won to regain their place in the English Football League. He was signed by Rovers manager Darrell Clarke on a permanent basis in June 2015, after his contract with Port Vale was cancelled by mutual consent. Lines made 36 appearances as Rovers won promotion with a third-place finish in 2015–16 and he would sign a new contract in June 2016.

The goal secured Rovers a trip to Stamford Bridge and a second round tie against Chelsea, which they ultimately lost 3–2. He scored his first league goal since his return in a late 2–1 comeback victory over Gillingham on 15 October as he embarked on a run from deep before calmly tucking the ball beyond opposition goalkeeper Jonathan Bond. His consistently good performances were rewarded with a new undisclosed-length contract in March 2017.

Speaking as the oldest member of the squad at the age of 32 in September 2017, he admitted to becoming a vegetarian as he restricted his diet in an attempt to extend his playing career. On 2 April 2018, he was sent off during a 2–0 defeat at Fleetwood Town and was subsequently abused by some of the club's supporters on social media. He ended the 2017–18 season with five goals in 47 appearances as Rovers posted a 13th-place finish in League One. On 21 August 2018, he scored a 76th-minute penalty in a 2–1 home defeat to Portsmouth, only to get sent off two minutes later for a studs up challenge on Brett Pitman. However he lost his first team place after Graham Coughlan replaced Clarke as manager in December; the player and new manager would have a strained relationship, which led Lines to call Coughlan "embarrassing".

On 8 May 2019, Lines was announced to be one of nine players who would be leaving the club at the end of their contract. Lines ended his second spell with his boyhood club having made over 350 appearances and having achieved three promotions during his two spells at the club.

Northampton Town
On 15 May 2019, Lines signed a two-year deal with League Two side Northampton Town; manager Keith Curle said that "I think his attributes will really help us". Darrell Clarke had tried to tempt him to join him at Walsall, but was unsuccessful. He quickly established himself as a key first-team player under Curle, starting nine of Northampton's first ten league games of the 2019–20 season. On 18 January, he scored a volleyed finish in a 4–1 victory over Morecambe, which was later voted as goal of the season (so far) by readers of the Northampton Chronicle & Echo during the COVID-19 pandemic in England. The season was curtailed and Northampton went on to qualify for the play-offs, though Lines was an unused substitute in the behind closed doors Wembley final as Northampton recorded a 4–0 victory over Exeter City to secure promotion into League One, the fifth promotion of Lines’ career. However he featured in just four League One and six cup games in the first half of the 2020–21 campaign and decided to leave Sixfields in search of regular game-time elsewhere.

Stevenage
Lines joined League Two club Stevenage on a six-month contract on 5 January 2021. He played 21 games in the second half of the 2020–21 season, helping Stevenage finish in 14th-place, and signed a new contract with the club. Lines opened his account in the second match of the 2021–22 season, opening the scoring in the 88th minute of an eventual 2–0 win over Lines' two-time former and boyhood club Bristol Rovers. Despite this however, Lines gave a lap of the pitch after the match, receiving applause from both sets of fans having walked out onto the pitch with his daughters before the match. Manager Alex Revell said that it was "a great goal from Chris, he deserves it. He was a key part of us last year". Lines was one of 15 players to be released by new manager Steve Evans at the end of the 2021–22 season, having made 36 appearances as Stevenage posted a 21st-place finish.

Bath City
On 19 June 2022, Lines agreed to join National League South club Bath City upon the expiration of his contract with Stevenage. This transfer saw Lines return to Twerton Park, as he had watched Bristol Rovers matches there as a child.

Style of play
Lines has strong technical passing attributes and vision. He has been described by the Sheffield Stars Paul Thompson as being a "cultured, creative, passing midfielder who gets on the ball and likes to dictate play... he's also very mobile and has decent vision". Port Vale manager Micky Adams described him as a "tall, strong central midfielder". He was described as a set-piece specialist by The Sentinel correspondent Dave Johnson.

Personal life
Lines likes hip-hop and rap music and tends to be in charge of the playlist in club dressing rooms.

Career statistics

HonoursBristol RoversFootball League Two play-offs: 2007
Conference Premier play-offs: 2015
Football League Two third-place promotion: 2015–16Sheffield WednesdayFootball League One second-place promotion: 2011–12Northampton Town'
EFL League Two play-offs: 2020

References

External links

1985 births
Living people
Footballers from Bristol
English footballers
Association football midfielders
Bitton A.F.C. players
Bristol Rovers F.C. players
Sheffield Wednesday F.C. players
Milton Keynes Dons F.C. players
Port Vale F.C. players
Northampton Town F.C. players
Stevenage F.C. players
Bath City F.C. players
English Football League players
National League (English football) players